Berkeley is a surname. It is also used, uncommonly, as a given name. The name is a habitation name from Berkeley, Gloucestershire, England, itself derived from Old English beorce léah meaning birch lea. People with the name include:

 The Berkeley family of England
 Baron Berkeley
 Berkeley baronets
 Anne Berkeley, Baroness Berkeley, lady-in-waiting to Anne Boleyn, Henry VIII's second wife
 Elizabeth Berkeley, Countess of Ormond, wife of Thomas Butler, 10th Earl of Ormond and daughter of the above
 Lady Henrietta Berkeley (born c. 1664, died 1706) 
 Anthony Berkeley Cox or Anthony Berkeley, writer
 Ballard Berkeley (1904–1988), English actor
 Busby Berkeley, film choreographer
 Edmund Berkeley (1909-1988), mathematician and computer scientist
 Elizabeth Berkeley (c1713-1799), wife of Charles Noel Somerset, 4th Duke of Beaufort
 George Berkeley (1685–1753), also known as Bishop Berkeley, Irish philosopher
 George Berkeley (died 1746) (1680–1746), MP for Dover 1720–1734
 Grantley Berkeley (1800–1881), British politician, writer 
 Humphrey Berkeley (1926–1994), British politician
 John Berkeley, 1st Baron Berkeley of Stratton (1602–1678), English soldier
 John Berkeley, 3rd Baron Berkeley of Stratton (1663–1697), English admiral
 Jon Berkeley, author and illustrator
 Sir Lennox Berkeley (1903–1989), English composer
 Mary Berkeley (born 1965), English long jumper
 Mary Berkeley (courtier), alleged mistress of Henry VIII and mother of his son, John Perrot
 Matthew Berkeley (born 1987), English footballer
 Michael Berkeley (born 1948), British composer and broadcaster
 Miles Joseph Berkeley (1803–1889), English cryptogramist and clergyman
 Norborne Berkeley, 4th Baron Botetourt (1718–1770), Member of Parliament and governor of Virginia Colony
 Randolph Carter Berkeley, a United States Marine Corps major general who received the Medal of Honor for his actions during the United States occupation of Veracruz.
 Reginald Cheyne Berkeley (1890–1935), British Liberal Party Member of Parliament 1922–1924, then a playwright and scriptwriter 
 Theresa Berkeley (died 1836), London dominatrix
 Sir William Berkeley (governor) (1605–1677), governor of Virginia
 Sir William Berkeley (Royal Navy officer) (1639–1666), English naval officer and admiral 
 Vivian Berkeley (born 1941), blind Canadian lawn bowling champion and 1996 paralympic silver medalist
 Xander Berkeley (born 1955), American actor

See also 
 Berkeley (given name)
 Berkley (disambiguation)
 Lord Berkeley (disambiguation)
 George Berkeley (disambiguation)
 Barclay

English-language surnames
English toponymic surnames